Borzna, also referred to as Borsna, is a historic town in northern Ukraine, in Nizhyn Raion of Chernihiv Oblast.  It hosts the administration of Borzna urban hromada, one of the hromadas of Ukraine. Population:

Location 

Borzna is located on the Desna, next to an international highway connecting Kyiv and Moscow (E101). Borzna has no railway (the nearest railway stations being Doch with north–south routes and Plysky with west–east routes.

The city derives its name from the river it lies on, a tributary of the Desna.

Climate 

Borzna has a humid continental climate (Koppen Dfb). Snow cover usually lies from mid-November to the end of March, with the frost-free period lasting 180 days on average, but surpassing 200 days in recent years.

History
Evidence of settlement in the area of present-day Borzna dates back to the Neolithic era, with Bronze Age and Scythian remains also having been unearthed. According to some modern writers, the earliest fortress (8th—13th centuries) would have been destroyed by the Batu Khan in the 1239.

Borzna was known during the 16th century as selishche, a farming community. As Borzna, it was founded in 1633. The area had been part of the Polish–Lithuanian Commonwealth (in the Kijów Voivodeship of the Crown of Poland) since before the Union of Lublin. Control of the town was wrested from the Commonwealth during the Khmelnytsky Uprising, after which natives of Ruthenia gained some degree of autonomy under Hetman Bohdan Khmelnytsky and his Cossack state. In 1648, Borzna was transformed into a Cossack regional center Borzna Regiment, and then, in 1650 — sotnia of the Nizhyn Regiment. Ivan Korsak, the Sotnik ((со́тник; en: group leader of one hundred Cossack voisko) of the city of Borzna received nobility on October 1, 1684.

By 1634 Borzna was granted Magdeburg Rights.

After 1654, the town became part of the Tsardom of Russia and became a county town in the Chernigov governorate in 1782, adopting the emblem of the Russian period.

240 families of the cossacks and 180 families of the peasants living in the town of Borzna in 1748. According to the census of 1859 there were total population of the town of Borzna is about 8,453.

Because of its distance from the railway (14 km), it has not grown (1897 pop 8,582). From 1923 Borzna is the administrative center of the Borznyanskyi raion (Borzna district).

In World War II, the town was occupied by Nazi Germany from September 11, 1941, to September 7, 1943.  On January 18, 1942, the Germans, with the support of Ukrainian police, rounded up all the local Jews they could find and massacred them at Shapovalivka. 126 people were killed, 179 removed to Germany.

On August 26, 1966, Borzna was attributed to the category of cities of district subordination.

Until 18 July 2020, Borzna was the administrative center of Borzna Raion. The raion was abolished in July 2020 as part of the administrative reform of Ukraine, which reduced the number of raions of Chernihiv Oblast to five. The area of Borzna Raion was merged into Nizhyn Raion.

Nowadays 
While the town benefits from vast farming lands surrounding it, it also has a metalwork and electronic chips plant, a brick factory, a lumber-processing factory, and a food industry. Among its educational institutions, there is an Agricultural Technicum, Panteleimon Kulish Gymnasium, and Khrystyna Alchevska secondary school, as well as a musical school.

Borzna has a concert hall (The House of Culture), Museum of Oleksandr Sayenko (an original artist who, despite being deaf and dumb, gained prominence by inventing his own technique of creating pictures out of straw), Museum of History, and an historical-memorial complex Hannyna Pustyn (commemorating a famous Ukrainian writer and activist of the 19th century Panteleimon Kulish and a peasant life writer Hanna Barvinok, (husband and wife) which is a ten-minute drive away in the nearby village of Motronivka.

The local newspaper the Visti Borznyanshchyny is published twice a week. The local community also operates a radio station which regularly produces programs about local events.

Notable people
Panteleimon Kulish — writer, critic, poet, folklorist, and translator
Semen Paliy — Ukrainian Cossack polkovnyk (colonel)
Ivan Plyushch — Ukrainian politician and former Chairman of the Verkhovna Rada (Ukrainian parliament)
Pavlo Polubotok — Acting Hetman of the Cossack era of Ukraine
Ivan Kharchenko — Hero of the Soviet Union, awarded for the World War II battles, born in the village Komarivka of the current Borzniansky rayon
 Ivan Korsak  — Cossack Sotnik 1684

Gallery

References

Bibliography 
 Історія міст і сіл Української CCP — Чернігівська область (1972) (History of Towns and Villages of the Ukrainian SSR — Chernihiv Oblast), Kiev. 
 
 David S. DuVal. (2004). Ukrainian Soul: The Story Of The Family Volkoff From Borzna. Lincoln, NE: iUniverse. — 193 p.

External links
 Official Borzna District Website
 Borzna District Council 
 The murder of the Jews of Borzna during World War II, at Yad Vashem website.

Cities in Chernihiv Oblast
Borznyansky Uyezd
Shtetls
Cities of district significance in Ukraine
Cossack Hetmanate
Blackboard places
Holocaust locations in Ukraine